Glaucodontia is a genus of moths of the family Crambidae. It contains only one species, Glaucodontia pyraustoides, which is found in North America, where it has been recorded from Utah, California and Nevada.

References

Odontiinae
Taxa named by Eugene G. Munroe
Crambidae genera
Monotypic moth genera